Arend Hauer (14 September 1909 – 27 January 1985) was a Dutch actor and drama teacher who appeared in several stage, television and radio dramas. He was the father of actor and environmentalist Rutger Hauer.

Filmography

Television
De Duivelsgrot (1963-1964)
De kleine waarheid (1970-1972)
Oorlogswinter (1975)

References

External links

1909 births
1985 deaths
Actors from Utrecht (city)
Dutch male stage actors
Dutch male television actors
Dutch male radio actors
20th-century Dutch male actors
Drama teachers